Elections to Rossendale Borough Council were held on 1 May 2003.  One third of the council was up for election and the Labour party lost overall control of the council to no overall control.

After the election, the composition of the council was
Labour 17
Conservative 17
Liberal Democrat 1
Independent 1

Election result

Ward results

References
2003 Rossendale election result
Ward results
First-ever Lib-Dem holds sway

2003
2003 English local elections
2000s in Lancashire